Marriage License? is a 1926 American drama film directed by Frank Borzage and written by Bradley King and Elizabeth Pickett Chevalier. It is based on the 1925 play The Pelican by F. Tennyson Jesse and H. M. Harwood. The film stars Alma Rubens, Walter McGrail, Richard Walling, Walter Pidgeon, Charles Lane and Emily Fitzroy. The film was released on September 5, 1926, by Fox Film Corporation.

Cast
Alma Rubens as Wanda Heriot
Walter McGrail as Marcus Heriot
Richard Walling as Robin
Walter Pidgeon as Paul
Charles Lane as Sir John
Emily Fitzroy as Lady Heriot
Langhorn Burton as Cheriton 
Edgar Norton as Beadon
George Cowl as Amercrombie
Lon Poff as Footman

References

External links
 

1926 films
1920s English-language films
Silent American drama films
1926 drama films
Fox Film films
Films directed by Frank Borzage
American silent feature films
American black-and-white films
1920s American films